is a 2012 Japanese television comedy series.

Cast
Aya Hirano as Mari Gonda
Uki Satake
Sayaka Nishiwaki
Kanae Yoshii
Umika Kawashima
Hirona Murata

References

External links
 

2012 Japanese television series debuts
Nippon TV dramas
2012 Japanese television series endings
Japanese comedy television series